Mariem "Maryama" Houij (born 8 August 1994) is a Tunisian footballer, who plays as a forward for Turkish Women's Super League club ALG Spor and the Tunisia women's national team.

Private life 
Mariem Houij was born in Sousse, Tunisia on 8 August 1994.

Club career 
She played in the Championnat de France de Football Féminine de Division 2 – Group B for the French club FC Vendenheim. She capped in 13 matches in the 2017–18 season.

Houij joined the Istanbul-based team Ataşehir Belediyespor on 20 July 2018. She took part at the 2018–19 UEFA Women's Champions League qualifying round. She played in all three matches of the qualification round, and scored two goals.

In the 2021-22 Turkcell Women's Super League season, she transferred to the Gaziantep-based club ALG Spor. She enjoyed the 2021-22 Women's Super League champion title of her team. On 18 August 2022, she played in the 2022–23 UEFA Women's Champions League.

International career 
She was a member of the Tunisia women's national football team at the 2014 African Women's Championship qualification, played in all two matches each of the First and Second Round, and scored one goal.

Career statistics 
.

Honours

Club 
 Turkish Women's Super League
 ALG Spor
 Champions (1): 2021-22

Individual 
 'Top goalscorer: 2018–19 (15 goals)

See also
List of Tunisia women's international footballers

References

External links 

1994 births
Living people
People from Sousse
Tunisian women's footballers
Women's association football forwards
Tunisia women's international footballers
Tunisian expatriate footballers
Expatriate women's footballers in France
Tunisian expatriate sportspeople in France
Expatriate women's footballers in Turkey
Tunisian expatriate sportspeople in Turkey
20th-century Tunisian women
21st-century Tunisian women
Ataşehir Belediyespor players
ALG Spor players
Turkish Women's Football Super League players